F1 2014 is a racing video game based on the 2014 Formula One season developed and published by Codemasters. Despite releasing during the lifespan of eighth-generation consoles PlayStation 4 and Xbox One, the game was released on seventh-generation consoles PlayStation 3 and Xbox 360 instead, in addition to a release on Microsoft Windows. F1 2014 is the last F1 game to be released in September/October, releasing during the latter month.

Features 
The game features the initial driver line-ups from the 2014 season. Substitute drivers Will Stevens and André Lotterer were not included in the game, as they both only raced once during the 2014 season. Furthermore, all races feature full grids of 22 drivers - in the real life season, the Marussia team were absent for the final three races of the season due to financial difficulties whilst Caterham also missed two races towards the end of the season due to financial difficulties before returning for the final round in Abu Dhabi. The game features the new turbo-hybrid cars introduced in the 2014 season, as well as the team and driver line-ups. All of the 2014 Formula One tracks are featured, including new additions like the Red Bull Ring, Hockenheimring, the brand-new Sochi Autodrom, and Bahrain in night conditions.

The game allows players to choose any team to drive for at the start of Career Mode, rather than forcing the player to start at a team lower down the grid, as in previous titles. Also unlike previous titles, the Career Mode allows players to choose from three different season lengths: seven races, 12 races or the full 19 races. The game also features a new driver evaluation test, and the Scenario Mode has been improved. The game does not feature Classic Content, a feature from the game's predecessor which allowed users to drive historic Formula One cars around historic tracks.

This is also the last Formula 1 game of the series to feature red flag.

Reception
  F1 2014 received "mixed or average" reviews, according to video game review aggregator Metacritic. Reviewers praised the new feel of the 2014 turbo-hybrid cars, the graphics, the racing action and some new features that made the game more accessible, but criticism of the lack of new major features and the removal of the classic content from the previous game resulted in mixed reviews.

Game Revolution gave the game a positive review with a rating of 4.5 out of 5, stating that its "authentic, fun racing balances accessibility and simulation well", and that "a focus shift from history and F1 melodrama to races alone is a welcome change". They also praised the graphics, calling them "superb for PS3/Xbox 360, with impressive weather effects".

The game received a mixed review from Eurogamer, rating it 5 out of 10, citing lack of new features and an uninspiring career mode. They also declared "it's a quantifiable step back for the series, saved only by the fact that what's there remains a satisfactory companion piece to this year's season if you're fortunate enough to have a decent steering wheel".

Hardcore Gamer gave the game a 4 out of 5, saying "F1 2014 plays to its strengths and doesn't get bogged down with clutter. While classic F1 races can't be recreated this year, the career mode is a far more diverse and enjoyable experience. The racing action is more intense than ever before, leading this to be one of most enjoyable F1 games ever created".

PC Gamer rated the game 67 out of 100, concluding that "with its fundamentals unchanged and last years foray into classic cars removed, F1 2014 provides very little beyond a perfunctory car and track update". They criticised the lack of new major features, sarcastically commenting that "on the back of F1 2014's box under 'new features', there may as well be a picture of a man shrugging apologetically".

References

External links

Codemasters website

Codemasters games
Ego (game engine) games
F1 (video game series)
PlayStation 3 games
Racing video games
2014 video games
Windows games
Xbox 360 games
Video games set in Australia
Video games set in Malaysia
Video games set in Bahrain
Video games set in China
Video games set in Spain
Video games set in Monaco
Video games set in Canada
Video games set in Austria
Video games set in the United Kingdom
Video games set in Germany
Video games set in Hungary
Video games set in Belgium
Video games set in Italy
Video games set in Singapore
Video games set in Japan
Video games set in Russia
Video games set in Texas
Video games set in Brazil
Video games set in the United Arab Emirates
Multiplayer and single-player video games
Video games developed in the United Kingdom